Stuffed peppers is a dish common in many cuisines. It consists of hollowed or halved peppers filled with any of a variety of fillings, often including meat, vegetables, cheese, rice, or sauce. The dish is usually assembled by filling the cavities of the peppers and then cooking.

China

The Cantonese version of stuffed peppers is part of a street food called Three Fried Stuffed Treasures (煎釀三寶), with stuffed peppers, stuffed aubergines, and stuffed sausage. Though with different vegetables and meat, the stuffing is all the same: dace fish paste. After assembling the fish paste, it is deep-fried. It is usually served with Worcestershire sauce, or can be served without sauce.

Spain
Stuffed peppers or pimientos rellenos are part of traditional Spanish cuisine, especially that of the region of the Basque Country. Usually piquillo peppers are used. The fillings might include Manchego cheese, chicken, or cod in a red sauce, with chicken likely being the most popular recipe.

India
Stuffed peppers (bharvan mirch or bharva hari mirch) is one of several stuffed vegetable (bharvan subji) dishes. It consists of bell peppers stuffed with cooked meat, potatoes, and onions and seasoned with chili, turmeric, coriander, cilantro, salt, and lemon juice. The peppers are then either browned in a tava (frying pan) or baked in an oven until the peppers are scorched.

Mirchi bajji or pakora is a chaat (street food) item and is a hot favorite during the monsoon and cooler months. In  Mumbai and western areas, the big green chilli pepper is stuffed with a roasted, spiced flour mix and fried. In the South, the big green chillies, similar to Hatch chili peppers, are dipped in a flour batter and fried. It may be accompanied by chutneys and sauces. In Andhra Pradesh and Tamil Nadu, some of the smaller but more potent chillies are also stuffed and fried, especially as a side to rice.

Eastern Mediterranean

Dolma is a family of stuffed dishes from Ottoman cuisine that can be served warm or cold. Some types of dolma are made with whole vegetables including whole peppers. Today, dolma are found in the cuisines of the Balkans, South Caucasus, Central Asia and the Levant, and the family cuisines of Sephardic and Iraqi Jews. Dolma dishes are found in Balkan, Caucasian, Arab, Israeli, Turkish, and Central Asian cuisine, and were historically part of the Ottoman palace cuisine. The word dolma, of Turkish origin, means "something stuffed".

North America

Stuffed peppers in American cuisine is a dish where bell peppers (often the green, yellow, orange, and red varieties) are typically filled with a stuffing such as ground beef, mixed with bread crumbs or cooked rice, eggs, herbs, and spices (especially paprika and parsley) and cheese. Recipes vary but often include hollowing out the peppers, boiling them, stuffing them, covering them with cheese, and baking or alternatively cooking them on the stove top at a slow simmer in canned tomato sauce until the peppers are soft. A sauce may be served with them, often a tomato sauce, but this, too, varies greatly.

Mexican and “Tex-Mex” cuisine has more than one stuffed pepper dish:

 The chile relleno, literally "stuffed pepper", consists of a roasted and peeled/skinned green pasilla or poblano pepper stuffed with cheese (traditionally queso fresco) and, occasionally, minced meat, covered in an egg batter, and fried. It is often served covered with a sauce, although the type of sauce varies widely. It is sometimes also served in a taco with rice, salsa and other toppings. This is also a popular offering at Tex-Mex restaurants in the southwestern U.S., but often cheddar cheese replaces the queso fresco.
 Jalapeño poppers are jalapeño peppers that have been hollowed out, stuffed with a mixture of cheese, spices, and sometimes ground meat, and then deep fried. The dish is common in Tex-Mex cuisine and less so in true Mexican cooking.

Guatemala
In Guatemala, the "pimiento" pepper is stuffed with shredded pork and vegetables.  As the Mexican version, it is covered with egg batter and fried.  It is served with tomato sauce or inside a bread bun.

Nordic and Baltic countries
 Nordic countries: Fyldte peberfrugter (Danish), Täytetyt paprikat (Finnish), Fylltar paprikur (Icelandic), Fylt paprika (Norwegian), Fyllda paprikor (Swedish).
 Baltic countries (Baltic States): Kimšti pipirai (Lithuanian) usually made with ground beef (or pork), rice, various vegetables and spices; Pildīti pipari (Latvian) and Täidisega paprika (Estonian) is  word phrase for "stuffed peppers".

Central and Southeast Europe

There are many names for stuffed peppers in the languages of Central and Southeast Europe:

Filana paprika or Punjena paprika (Croatian)
Speca të mbushur (Albanian) 
Γεμιστά (Gemista) (Greek) 
Filovana paprika (Bosnian)
Пуњена паприка (Serbian)
Filana paprika or Polnjena paprika (Slovenian)
Faszerowana papryka (Polish)
Gefüllte Paprika (German)
Töltött paprika (Hungarian)
Полнети пиперки (Polneti piperki) (Macedonian)
Plněná paprika (Czech)
Plnená Paprika (Slovak)
  Пълнени чушки (Pulneni chushki) (Bulgarian)
  Фарширований перець (Ukrainian)
 Ardei umpluți  (Romanian)
 biber dolmasi  (Turkish)

This dish consists of peppers filled with minced meat and rice; in all the languages the name translates to a variant of "filled/stuffed/full peppers". Most popular in the Zagorje and Vojvodina regions, it is influenced by Hungarian cuisine. The meat, usually ground beef, is mixed with herbs, spices and rice. In Bulgaria, stuffed peppers are usually eaten with yogurt. Another variety of stuffed peppers in Bulgaria is made with mixed white cheese and eggs instead of meat and rice as stuffing.

In Romanian cuisine stuffed peppers are usually prepared with bell peppers stuffed with ground meat (usually pork), rice, onion, and other vegetables and spices and then boiled in a sauce made from cream, tomatoes, and spices.

Stuffed peppers are often cooked by Romani people and is a popular dish in Romani cuisine.

See also
 List of stuffed dishes

References

Stuffed vegetable dishes
American cuisine
Mexican cuisine
Guatemalan cuisine
Romani cuisine
Balkan cuisine
Scandinavian cuisine
Lithuanian cuisine